Live at Wembley '86 is a double live album by the British rock band Queen. It was recorded live on Saturday 12 July 1986 during The Magic Tour at Wembley Stadium in London, England. The album was released on 26 May 1992, with a companion DVD released in June 2003.

The album was remastered and re-released with bonus tracks in August 2003 in the US as Live at Wembley Stadium after the companion DVD. This name has also been used on subsequent releases elsewhere, although they lack the bonus tracks included with the US version.

A remastered special edition DVD was released on 5 September 2011 in the UK (what would have been Freddie Mercury's 65th birthday), and for the first time included the Friday evening concert in addition to the Saturday night show. Snippets of the Friday show were included on earlier DVDs, but the remastered release marked the first time that the concert has been presented in full. A Deluxe Edition also included the Saturday concert in remastered CD form.

Track listing

Disc one

Disc two

Bonus tracks on 2003 Hollywood Records remaster
 "A Kind of Magic (Live 11 July 1986 at Wembley Stadium, London)"
 "Another One Bites the Dust (Live 11 July 1986 at Wembley Stadium, London)"
 "Crazy Little Thing Called Love (Live 11 July 1986 at Wembley Stadium, London)"
 "Tavaszi szél vízet áraszt (Live 27 July 1986 at Népstadion, Budapest, Hungary)"

The original Friday concert
The original Friday concert started at 4.00pm with tickets costing £14.50. Four bands performed in the following order:
INXS
The Alarm
Status Quo
Queen

Charts

Weekly charts

Year-end charts

Certifications and sales

Personnel
Freddie Mercury – lead vocals, piano, guitar, tambourine
Brian May – guitars, keyboards, backing vocals
Roger Taylor – drums, tambourine, backing vocals
John Deacon – bass guitars, backing vocals
Additional Musicians
Spike Edney – keyboards, piano, guitar, backing vocals

References

External links
 Queen official website: Discography: Live at Wembley '86: includes lyrics of "In Lap of the Gods...Revisited", "(You're So Square) Baby I Don't Care", "Hello Mary Lou (Goodbye Heart)", "Tutti Frutti", "Gimme Some Lovin'", "Big Spender", "Radio Gaga".

Queen (band) live albums
1992 live albums
Hollywood Records live albums
Parlophone live albums
Live albums recorded at Wembley Stadium